Bright Armenia is a classical liberal political party in Armenia founded on 12 December 2015.

History
In 2017, Bright Armenia launched an educational program aimed at advancing and promoting liberal politics, known as the Institute of Liberal Politics (ILP); it is an affiliated member of the European Liberal Forum.

In the 2017 Armenian parliamentary election and the 2017 Yerevan City Council election, the party took part in the elections as part of the Way Out Alliance, gaining few seats.

In the 2018 Yerevan City Council election, the party ran as a part of the Bright Alliance. The alliance won three seats in the Yerevan City Council, with two seats taken by Bright Armenia and one seat taken by the Hanrapetutyun Party.

Following the 2018 Armenian parliamentary election, Bright Armenia became the third largest party in the National Assembly and one of the two official opposition parties, the other being Prosperous Armenia.

In May 2021, the party confirmed it would participate in the 2021 Armenian parliamentary elections. Following the election, the party gained just 1.2% of the popular vote, losing all political representation in the National Assembly. The party currently acts as an extra-parliamentary force.

Political position 
Bright Armenia is a liberal, pro-European political party. Edmon Marukyan called for raising relations with the European Union to a strategic partnership level. Party members also advocate for visa-free travel of Armenian citizens to the EU's Schengen Area. The party opposes Armenia's current membership in the Eurasian Union and believes that Armenia should withdraw its membership and begin to negotiate an Association Agreement and Deep and Comprehensive Free Trade Area with the European Union. Bright Armenia supports Armenia's full membership in the EU and wishes to begin the first steps of accession negotiations without delay.

The party manifesto states, "Armenia should show initiative in pan-European processes and structures, presenting itself as the true bearer of the values of European civilization and democracy."

Despite the party's Pro-European orientation, Bright Armenia also believes in maintaining positive cooperation with Russia and ensuring that the interests of Armenia are not compromised in favor of other countries.

Party council 
The party council consists of 12 members.

 Edmon Marukyan - President of the Party
 Mane Tandilyan - Vice-President of the Party
 Gevorg Gorgisyan
 Davit Khazhakyan
 Ani Samsonyan
 Beniamin Pluzyan
 Armen Yeghiazaryan
 Grigori Dokhoyan
 Anna Kostanyan
 Harutyun Babayan
 Sergey Anisonyan
 Karen Simonyan

Electoral record

Parliamentary elections 
Party leader Edmon Marukyan, was elected as an independent MP following the 2012 Armenian parliamentary election.

Local elections

Yerevan City Council elections

See also

Programs of political parties in Armenia

References

Political parties established in 2015
2015 establishments in Armenia
Political parties in Armenia
Alliance of Liberals and Democrats for Europe Party member parties
Centrist parties in Europe
Classical liberal parties
Pro-European political parties in Armenia
Liberal parties in Armenia